David Wiggins  (born 1933) is an English moral philosopher, metaphysician, and philosophical logician working especially on identity and issues in meta-ethics.

Biography 
David Wiggins was born on 8 March 1933 in London, the son of Norman and Diana Wiggins (née Priestley). He attended St Paul's School before reading philosophy at Brasenose College, Oxford, where he obtained a first-class degree. His tutor was J. L. Ackrill.

After completing his National Service, he joined the Civil Service and was appointed Assistant Principal in the Colonial Office, 1957-8. He left the Civil Service and was Jane Eliza Proctor Visiting Fellow at Princeton University in 1958-9. Returning to Oxford, he was Lecturer, 1959, then Fellow and Lecturer, 1960-7, at New College. After that, he was Chair of Philosophy at Bedford College, London, 1967–80; Fellow and Praelector in Philosophy at University College, Oxford, 1981-9; and Professor of Philosophy at Birkbeck College, University of London, 1989–94; and Wykeham Professor of Logic and Fellow of New College, Oxford, 1994-2000.

Wiggins was made a fellow of the British Academy in 1978. He was also President of the Aristotelian Society from 1999 to 2000. He was elected a foreign honorary member of the American Academy of Arts and Sciences in 1992.

Philosophical work 
Wiggins is well known for his work in metaphysics, particularly identity. In his Sameness and Substance (Oxford, 1980), he proposed conceptualist realism, a position according to which our conceptual framework maps reality. According to philosopher Harold Noonan:

He has also made an influential contribution to ethics. His 2006 book, Ethics.  Twelve Lectures on the Philosophy of Morality defends a position he calls "moral objectivism".

He has written widely on other areas including philosophy of language, epistemology, aesthetics and political philosophy.

A Festschrift, Essays for David Wiggins was published in 1996.

Legacy
Wiggins' distinguished pupils include: John McDowell, Derek Parfit, Jonathan Westphal, Timothy Williamson and Cheryl Misak.

Selected writings

Books
 Identity and Spatio-Temporal Continuity (Oxford, 1967)
 Truth, Invention, and the Meaning of Life (Proceedings of the British Academy, 1976)
 Sameness and Substance (Harvard, 1980)
 Needs, Values, Truth (1987, 3rd ed., 1998, rev. 2002)
 Sameness and Substance Renewed (Cambridge, 2001)
 Ethics. Twelve Lectures on the Philosophy of Morality (Harvard, 2006)
 Solidarity and the Root of the Ethical (2008)
 Continuants. Their Activity, Their Being, and Their Identity (Oxford, 2016)

Articles
 "On Being in the Same Place at the same time", Philosophical Review, vol. 77 (1968), pp. 90–95.
 "On Sentence-sense, Word-sense and Difference of Word-sense: Towards a Philosophical Theory of Dictionaries" (1971) (link)
 "Towards a reasonable libertarianism" (Essays on Freedom of Action, Routledge & Kegan Paul, 1973)
 "Weakness of Will Commensurability, and the Objects of Deliberation and Desire" (Proceedings of the Aristotelian Society, 1978)
 "A Sensible Subjectivism?" (Needs, Values, Truth: Essays in the Philosophy of Value, New York: Oxford University Press, 1987, 185–214)

References

External links
 Picture of Wiggins - on the Ryle Room page.

1933 births
20th-century British non-fiction writers
20th-century English philosophers
20th-century essayists
21st-century British non-fiction writers
21st-century English philosophers
21st-century essayists
Analytic philosophers
Alumni of Brasenose College, Oxford
Aristotelian philosophers
British male essayists
English logicians
English male non-fiction writers
Epistemologists
Fellows of New College, Oxford
Fellows of the British Academy
Fellows of University College, Oxford
Lecturers
Living people
Metaphilosophers
Metaphysicians
Ontologists
Philosophers of art
Philosophers of language
Philosophers of logic
Philosophers of mind
Philosophy academics
Philosophy writers
Political philosophers
Presidents of the Aristotelian Society
Wykeham Professors of Logic